Skrzeszewo may refer to:
Skrzeszewo, Pomeranian Voivodeship, a village in northern Poland
Skrzeszewo, West Pomeranian Voivodeship, a village in north-western Poland